Oberhofen im Inntal is a municipality in the western district of Innsbruck-Land in the Austrian state of Tyrol located 21 km west of Innsbruck and 2.6 km east of Telfs. Once a part of Pfaffenhofen it became an own municipality in 1786.

Population

References

External links

Cities and towns in Innsbruck-Land District